Nizwa Sports Complex is a multi-use stadium in Nizwa, Oman.  It is currently used mostly for football matches and is the home ground of Al-Khabourah SC of the Omani League.  The stadium has a capacity of 14,400 spectators.

External links
 Stadium information

Football venues in Oman